Roland Freier (born 16 January 1964) is a German former speed skater. He competed in two events at the 1988 Winter Olympics representing East Germany.

References

External links
 

1964 births
Living people
German male speed skaters
Olympic speed skaters of East Germany
Speed skaters at the 1988 Winter Olympics
People from Barth, Germany
Sportspeople from Mecklenburg-Western Pomerania